Supriyono Paimin is an Indonesian footballer who previously plays as striker for the Indonesia national team.

References

Association football forwards
Indonesian footballers
Indonesia international footballers
Indonesian Premier Division players
Living people
Year of birth missing (living people)
Place of birth missing (living people)